Douglas Lee "Tim" Jamerson, Jr. (October 16, 1947 – April 21, 2001) was a Florida Commissioner of Education. He was appointed to the position in 1993 after former Betty Castor resigned to become President of the University of South Florida. He was defeated in his bid for a full term in 1994 by Frank Brogan.

Jamerson grew up in the poor neighborhoods in St. Petersburg, Florida. He planned to attend Gibbs High School, but his grandmother encouraged him to go to Bishop Barry High School (now St. Petersburg Catholic High School) instead, where he was the school's first black student. Jamerson graduated from St. Petersburg Junior College and received his bachelor's degree in criminal justice from the University of South Florida. He also was a graduate of St. Petersburg Police Academy.

Jamerson was elected to the Florida House of Representatives in 1982 from District 55 representative and served 5.5 terms  Governor Lawton Chiles appointed him state education commissioner in 1993, but he lost the seat to Frank Brogan in the 1994 election, in which Republicans made substantial gains; had Jamerson won, he would have been the first black elected to statewide office since 1868. After his loss, Chiles appointed him as secretary of the state Department of Labor.

Jamerson died of cancer at the Tallahassee Memorial Hospital in 2001, at the age of 53.

References

Florida Commissioners of Education
2001 deaths
African-American state legislators in Florida
University of South Florida alumni
1947 births
20th-century American politicians
Democratic Party members of the Florida House of Representatives
20th-century African-American politicians